Hanze University of Applied Sciences, Groningen (Hanze UAS) is the largest technical & vocational university in the northern Netherlands and is located in Groningen.

Hanze UAS offers various Bachelor and Master programmes in Dutch, English, and German, and works closely with international partner institutes. The school counts approximately 28,000 students and 3,200 employees. About, 8,1% of students are international.

History
Hanze UAS was founded in 1986 as the merger of various local institutes for professional education, the oldest of which is the Academie Minerva, founded in 1798, which was the first multi-sectoral institute for practical higher education in the Netherlands. The mission of the Academy Minerva was “The improvement of Drawing, Construction and Nautical Sciences, together with the aligned Arts and Sciences, within all ranks of society, and in particular to improve the skills of the disadvantaged." Throughout the centuries that followed many more institutions, engaged in a wide range of different fields, were established.

In 1986, Groningen was the first city in the Netherlands where 16 of the 24 vocational schools merged into a larger institute, as recommended in the government paper “Expansion, Division of Tasks, and Concentration in the Higher Educational System”. Hence, Hanze became quickly one of the biggest Universities of Applied Sciences in the nation and data suggests it is growing every year. In 1989 the university joined the Erasmus Programme and in 2014 Hanze became holder of the Erasmus Charter of Higher Education 2014–2020.

The name of Hanze UAS is linked to the Hanseatic League (Dutch: Hanze). Groningen, the city hosting the majority of the university's facilities, was member of the Hanseatic League between 1282 and 1669.

Facts and Figures 
(from March 20, 2019)
28,432 students
8.1% International students
4.136 graduates
3,280 staff
54 bachelor's programmes (15 English or German-taught)
19 master's programmes (12 English-taught)
8 associate degrees
220 lecturers
99 phD students
Lecturers in Honours Talent programmes: 25

Locations
Hanze University has the majority of its major facilities in Groningen, with few minor ones in Amsterdam (Dance Academy), Assen (Hanze Institute of Technology) and Leeuwarden (Pop Culture).

The remaining 16 schools are located in the city of Groningen. With the exception of the oldest facility, the Academy Minerva, that is in the city center, all major facilities are in the Zernike Campus (Named after Frits Zernike). This large area north of the city (in the Noordwest district) is home to both Hanze institutions and facilities of the University of Groningen, the research university of the city. The campus overall hosts about 60,000 students.

Schools

Academy Minerva, School for Fine Art and Design
Academy for Pop Culture
Hanze Institute of Technology (HIT)
International Business School Groningen
North Netherlands Dance Academy
Prince Claus Conservatoire
School of Architecture, Built Environment and Civil Engineering
School of Communication, Media and IT (SCMI)
School of Education
School of Facility Management Groningen
School of Engineering
School of Health Care Studies
School of Law Groningen
Institute for Life Science and Technology
School of Financial and Economic Management (Dutch)
School of Nursing
School of Marketing Management
School of Sport Studies
School of Social Studies

Bachelor programmes

Sensor Technology
Design
Fine Art
Classical Music (Prince Claus Conservatoire)
School Music / Classroom Education
Composition Music and Studio Productions (Prince Claus Conservatoire)
Conducting (Prince Claus Conservatoire)
Electronic Product Design and Engineering EPDE 
Integral Product Development
Internationale Betriebswirtschaft German taught programme (BW)
International Biomedical Engineering 
International Business
International Civil Engineering Management
International Communication
International Construction Management 
International Facility Management
International Finance and Control
International Power Generation and Distribution 
Jazz (Prince Claus Conservatoire)
Marketing Management
Medical Imaging and Radiation Oncology (Dutch taught programme)
Nursing (Dutch taught programme)
Nutrition and Dietetics (Dutch taught programme)
Oral Hygiene (Dutch taught programme)
Physiotherapy
Speech Therapy (Dutch taught programme)
Sport Studies

Master programmes

Master in International Communication (MIC)
Master in International Business and Management (MIBM)
Master of Business Administration (MBA) (full-time and part-time)
Master of Fine Arts Interactive Media and Environments
Master of Fine Arts Painting
Master of Fine Arts Scenography
Master of Media, Art, Design & Technology (MADtech)
Master of Music
European Master in Sustainable Energy System Management (EUREC)
European Master in Renewable Energy (EUREC)
Master Data Science for Life Sciences
Master Smart Systems Engineering
MSc in Business Studies (Interdisciplinary Business Professional)
Master Energy for Society
Master in Architecture (part-time)

Notable alumni 

Notable Alumni of the Hanze University of Applied Sciences (including students from the Academie Minerva) include:

 Wim Crouwel, Graphic designer
 Jozef Israëls, Painter
 Martijn Verschoor, Racing cyclist
 Alida Jantina Pott, Visual artist
 Otto Eerelman, Painter and lithographer
 Kimberley Bos, Bobsleigher
 Matthijs Röling, Painter
 Anno Smith, Sculptor
 Peter Snijders, Politician of the VVD (Mayor of Zwolle)
 Aleksandar Alekov, Bulgarian public figure

References and notes

External links
  Official website
  History

 
Vocational universities in the Netherlands
1986 establishments in the Netherlands
Educational institutions established in 1986